El Dorado was a Japanese visual kei rock band formed in January 1999 with members Kaede, Shunsuke, Shoki, Yuu and Ruli.

Biography
Their first live was on 10 November 1999. The band started out by releasing three demos that were heavier visual rock. The mini album Egoism was released on 21 March 2001. After the band managed to sign with Tristar, they presented their new musical style that was lighter and more romantic. In autumn 2001, Ruli left the band and Tetora subsequently joined in as the new guitarist. Their new album Aula was a success despite that. Kaede then changed his name to Yuki and Tetora to Tomo.

29 January was the release day of their first DVD, Venus. In between the songs, there is much additional off-stage material. The mini album Birth continued in this new direction and this time the band was sent to France to record new PVs (Music Videos). The record company promoted the band a lot, which is unusual for smaller acts. Their trip to Paris was used for filming material for their next DVD, Video Birth, and for releasing a photo book called Birth in Paris.

In 2003, ElDorado tired of searching for their final breakthrough and they decided to return to their roots. In order to symbolize the change, the band's name was changed to EllDorado and they changed their logo. The DVD Ekiribako was the first official material from the new style.

EllDorado met trouble in the year 2004. Single releases were pushed back and the CD PUZZLE was cancelled completely. They officially disbanded on 26 August 2004.

However, Elldorado returned together once more for a concert on 26 August 2006 at HOLIDAY Shinjuku. On the same day, they also released another 'Best of' collection, this time including a DVD as well.

Members
Kaede/Yuki was the vocalist of El Dorado, and started the band Glamorous Honey with two ex-members of New Sodmy.
Yuu, guitarist, went to the band Siva (as Youichi or Yuuichi), which disbanded July 2009. He played in a session band called "Casket" on 24 December 2009.
Tetora/Tomo (Real Name: Katakura Tomohiro) was born 31 August in Saitama. He is now in the band CODE after changing his stage name again.
Shunsuke, the band's bass player, joined the band BIS. He died on 28 March 2010.
Shouki played the drums.
Ruli started as a guitarist for El Dorado but left in 2001.
Rui was a vocalist for El Dorado.
Ayame was the previous guitarist for El Dorado.

Releases

Albums
Egoism (mini-album) 2001-03-21
Aula 2001-11-28
Silence (mini-album) 2002-11-28
Fragrance Set (mini-album) 2002-12-21
Flying Dragon 2003-06-25
Puzzle 2004-01-28
Freedom 2004-08-11
Saikai (再会) 2006-08-26

Singles
"otogirisou" 2001-08-20
"Birth" 2002-04-24
"Moment" 2002-12-21
"kamisama no usotsuki" 2003
"mujouken houfuku" 2003
"zetsubou shou" 2003
"sabu karuchaa" 2003
"Refrain (Shunsuke version)" 2004-01-05
"Refrain (Tomo version)" 2004-02-04
"Refrain (You version)" 2004-03-03
"Refrain (Shoki version)" 2004-04-07
"Refrain (Yuki version)" 2004-05-12

Compilations
"XIII File Vol.1" 2010-02-17

Video
Venus 2002-01-29
Video Birth 2002-07-17
Daydream 2002-08-01
Special Box 2nd Version 2003-03-26
Ekiribako (絵桐箱) 2003-05-02

Book
BIRTH in Paris (Photo book) 2002-07-03

Demo
Kisagi (如月) 1999
Shinbatsu to Kaikisen (神罰と回帰線) 2000-02-24
Kakumeiron (革命論) 2000-04-28
Tensei no Tsubasa (転生の翼) 2000-08-9

References

Visual kei musical groups
Japanese rock music groups